Conservation in Australia is an issue of state and federal policy. Australia is one of the most biologically diverse countries in the world, with a large portion of  species endemic to Australia. Preserving this wealth of biodiversity is important for future generations.

Animal habitats like reefs and forests must be preserved in order to preserve the population and diversity of animal species. Conservation is vital for future study and for field research to be taken, and because biological richness is an unmeasurable aesthetic that may be developed into commercial recreational attractions.

According to Janine Benyus, the potential for advances in biomimicry in Australia is great because the extreme weather and conditions found here provide an excellent evolutionary incubator. Research on natural processes can only occur if the habitat is preserved and organisms continue to thrive.

Federal and State governments manage protected areas and national parks; a number of non-governmental organizations are also involved in conservation.

Conservation issues

A key conservation issue is the preservation of biodiversity, especially by protecting the remaining rainforests. The destruction of habitat by human activities, including land clearing, remains the major cause of biodiversity loss in Australia. The importance of the Australian rainforests to the conservation movement is very high. Australia is the only western country to have large areas of rainforest intact. Forests provide timber, drugs, and food and should be managed to maximize the possible uses. Currently, there are a number of environmental movements and campaigners advocating for action on saving the environment, one such campaign is the Big Switch.

Land management issues including clearance of native vegetation, reafforestation of once-cleared areas, control of exotic weeds and pests, expansion of dryland salinity, and changed fire regimes. Intensification of resource use in sectors such as forestry, fisheries, and agriculture are widely reported to contribute to biodiversity loss in Australia. Coastal and marine environments also have reduced biodiversity from reduced water quality caused by pollution and sediments arising from human settlements and agriculture. In central New South Wales where there are large plains of grassland, problems have arisen from—unusual to say—lack of land clearing.

Shark culling (the killing of sharks) currently occurs in New South Wales and Queensland (in government "shark control" programs). These programs have damaged the marine ecosystem. Roughly 50,000 sharks have been killed by Queensland authorities since 1962, including in the Great Barrier Reef. Queensland's "shark control" program has been called "outdated, cruel and ineffective". The "shark control" programs in New South Wales and Queensland have killed thousands of animals, such as turtles and dolphins. In 2018, the Humane Society International filed a lawsuit against the government of Queensland to stop shark culling in the Great Barrier Reef.

Specific issues:
 Blue Gum Forest
 Fraser Island
 Franklin Dam
 Lake Pedder
 Uranium mining in Kakadu National Park
 Plight of the Murray River system
 Shark culling in New South Wales and Queensland

Legal framework
Conservation of the natural environment in Australia is derived from five different sources of law, namely international law, federal law, State law and local government law as well as the application of the common law.

International environmental law
International agreements that affect conservation policy in Australia.

Federal law
The primary federal law is the Environment Protection and Biodiversity Conservation Act 1999 (Cth), usually referred to as the EPBC Act.

Protected areas

There are numerous protected areas in all States and Territories that have been created to protect and preserve Australia's unique ecosystems. Protected areas include national parks and other reserves, as well as 64 wetlands which are registered under the Ramsar Convention and 16 World Heritage Sites. , 10.8% of the total land area of Australia is within a protected area. Protected marine zones have been created in many areas to preserve marine biodiversity; as of 2002 they cover about 7% of Australia's marine jurisdiction. 

Protected areas of include those managed by the federal Department of the Environment and Energy, and national parks and other protected areas managed by the states, Agencies responsible for protected areas include:

Director of National Parks
Great Barrier Reef Marine Park Authority
New South Wales Department of Environment and Climate Change
Parks Victoria
Queensland Parks and Wildlife Service
Department of Environment and Water  (South Australia)
Department of Environment and Conservation (Western Australia)
Tasmania Parks and Wildlife Service
Chief Minister's Department (Australian Capital Territory)
Parks and Wildlife Commission of the Northern Territory

Threatened species

Conservation organisations
A number of governmental and non-governmental organisations work in the conservation and restoration of the Australian environment.

Australian Conservation Foundation
Australian Koala Foundation
Australian Marine Conservation Society
Australian Native Plants Society
Australian Rainforest Conservation Society
Australian Wildlife Society
Australian Wildlife Conservancy
Banksia Environmental Foundation
BirdLife Australia
Bush Heritage Australia
Clean Up Australia
Conservation Volunteers Australia
  Environment Tasmania
Foundation for National Parks & Wildlife
Green Corps
Greening Australia
Landcare Australia
National Parks Australia Council
Natural Heritage Trust Australia
Nature Foundation
NSW Wildlife Information Rescue and Education Service
Planet Ark
Queensland Trust for Nature (see Avoid Island)
Rainforest Rescue
Sustainable Population Australia
Sydney Metropolitan Wildlife Service
Wilderness Society
Trees for Life
Wildlife Preservation Society of Queensland
Wildlife Warriors
World Wide Fund for Nature#WWF-Australia

References

External links
State of the Environment reporting